Songs from the Wood is the tenth studio album by British progressive rock band Jethro Tull, released on 11 February 1977 by Chrysalis Records. The album is considered to be the first of three folk rock albums released by the band at the end of the 1970s: Songs from the Wood, Heavy Horses (1978) and Stormwatch (1979).

Drawing inspiration from English folklore and countryside living, the album signalled a resumption of the band's wide-ranging folk rock style which combined traditional instruments and melodies with hard rock drums, synthesisers and electric guitars, all laid in the band's complex progressive rock template. The album was the first Jethro Tull album to include Dee Palmer as an official member of the band, who after eight years of serving as the band's orchestral arranger had joined as a second keyboardist in early 1976.

The album was well received by critics upon its initial release, who considered the album a return to form for the band after several poorly reviewed albums.

Recording
The band began recording on 14 September 1976, recording "Ring Out, Solstice Bells" and finished on 16 November 1976, finishing "Jack-in-the-Green". All tracks were recorded in Studio 2 of Morgan Studios (except "Jack-in-the-Green", recorded in Studio 3 with Anderson on all instruments), the same studio where the band had recorded the majority of their discography up to that point. The album marked a return for the band to recording in the UK after having recorded their previous two albums abroad in Monaco.

Compared to previous Jethro Tull albums, Songs From the Wood saw greater writing contributions from other members of the band besides Anderson, particularly from new keyboardist Dee Palmer and guitarist Martin Barre. Palmer wrote significant portions of several songs, including the title track, "Hunting Girl", "Velvet Green", "Ring Out, Solstice Bells" and "Pibroch (Cap in Hand)" and also introduced the portative pipe organ to the rest of the band, an instrument which became a major element of the album's classical folk sound. The band made use of a variety of other instruments and recording techniques to contribute to the album's folk theme, including medieval-era percussion played by Barlow such as nakers and a tabor as well as a reverse echo guitar effect played by Barre on "Pibroch (Cap in Hand)" to imitate the sound of bagpipes. "Ring Out, Solstice Bells" was recorded with the intention of being a Christmas single. However Chrysalis Records disliked that the song was in 7/4 time and asked the band to re-record the song in the more common 4/4 time, a suggestion which Anderson said that the band "weren't particularly pleased with."  The band re-recorded the song, now re-titled "Magic Bells" at Lansdowne Studios with Mike Batt of the Wombles producing, however the decision was eventually made by Chrysalis to scrap the new version and release the original instead. One song recorded during the sessions for the album was cut, initially titled "Dark Ages" (the same name of a different song later featured on the band's 1979 album Stormwatch), the track remained unreleased until 2017 when it was included on the 40th Anniversary "Country Set" edition of the album, where it was given the title "Old Aces Die Hard" by Anderson.

The band have identified the writing and recording sessions for the album as being a high point in personal relations within the band. Anderson credited the familiar surroundings of Morgan Studios with creating "a more relaxed and harmonious atmosphere in the band" with drummer Barrie Barlow agreeing that "I think we were indeed more settled and happier to be home." Palmer recalled that "On every measure the whole of that album was recorded in an atmosphere of great camaraderie and joy... Everybody was friends, everybody was happy." The band held a wrap party upon completion of the album's mixing, described by Anderson as "one of the very few occasions when we did have a slightly triumphal celebration of the finished thing."

Musical style and themes
Filled with imagery from medieval Britain (especially in the "Jack-in-the-Green", "Cup of Wonder", and "Ring Out Solstice Bells" lyrics), and ornamental folk arrangement (as in "Velvet Green" and "Fire at Midnight"), Songs From the Wood was a departure from the hard rock of earlier Jethro Tull material, though it still retained some of the band's older, progressive sound.

Anderson's inspiration to pursue folk was inspired by recent changes in his personal life; he had recently gotten married and purchased a farm estate in rural Buckinghamshire, giving him "an opportunity to evaluate and reflect upon the cultural and historical significance of making that commitment to English residency." Anderson was also partly inspired by the book Folklore, Myths and Legends of Britain which was given to him by Jethro Tull's then manager Jo Lustig in 1976.  According to Anderson, the book "certainly gave me thoughts about the elements of characters and stories that played out in my songwriting on the Songs From the Wood album, which then carried on over to the Heavy Horses album and even beyond that into the Stormwatch album."

Critical reception

In a retrospective review, AllMusic called Songs from the Wood "the prettiest record Jethro Tull released at least since Thick as a Brick". Paul Stump lauded the album in his History of Progressive Rock, saying that "the barbed, rickety grandeur that Tull had left behind with Benefit had been rebottled in punchy numbers with enough melodic contours to satisfy latter-day FM-radio demands. Once again, the band's riffs are unremarkable, but counterpointed – such as with synthesisers playing off mandolin on the title track – and the impact is mesmerizing." He also praised the depth of the soundstage, the emphasis of the folk element in the lyrics, and the way riffs are shared around the instrumental ensemble.

In 2014 Songs from the Wood was included in the list The 100 Greatest Prog Albums of All Time by Prog magazine at number 76. In 2000 it was voted number 520 in Colin Larkin's All Time Top 1000 Albums.

Legacy
"Ring Out, Solstice Bells" has become popular as a Christmas song in the United Kingdom. It has been featured in lists of classic and favourite Christmas songs, and a re-recorded version appears on The Jethro Tull Christmas Album.

Members of the band have ranked the album highly in retrospect, with Anderson counting it as among his top five personal favourite Jethro Tull albums.

Cover 

Although the front cover carries no credit to the effect, the back cover features the  credit  "front cover painting by Jay L. Lee". In fact, it is a photo on which outlines, lines and contours have simply been drawn with a pen (see tree branches, the dog's snout and Anderson's boots), with paint only occasionally added over the photo (as in the fire). The fact that this is a photo and not a painting is backed up by several other similar photos from the same photo session, some of which were used in the programme for the British tour in 1977, as well as on the concert poster. The  credit  "painting by ..." is probably based on a typical trick by Ian Anderson, who likes to joke with his fans. "Painting by" could also only refer to the post-processing of the photo. The LP cover depicts Ian Anderson sitting on a campfire after a successful hunt with a dog and prey. The full wording on the front cover is "Jethro Tull // with kitchen prose, gutter rhymes and divers // songs from the wood".

Track listing

1977 original release

2017 40th Anniversary The Country Set Deluxe Edition
On 17 May 2017 Jethro Tull released a five disc "bookset" version of Songs from the Wood with a 96-page booklet that includes a track-by-track annotation of the album and its associated recordings by Ian Anderson.  It is similar to the band's other 40th Anniversary reissues, with the first disc containing another Steven Wilson stereo remix and the previously unreleased songs "Old Aces Die Hard" and "Working John, Working Joe." The second and third discs contain 22 previously unreleased live tracks, recorded on the American leg of the 1977 Songs from the Wood Tour, from 21 November (Landover, Maryland) and 6 December (Boston), remixed to stereo by Jakko Jakszyk.  The set also includes DVDs.

Personnel
Jethro Tull
 Ian Anderson – lead vocals, flute, acoustic guitar, mandolin, cymbals, whistles; all instruments (on track 2).
 Martin Barre – electric guitar, lute
 John Glascock – backing vocals, bass guitar
 John Evan – piano, organ, synthesisers
 Dee Palmer – piano, portative pipe organ, synthesisers
 Barriemore Barlow – drums, percussion, marimba, glockenspiel, bells, nakers, tabor

Additional personnel
 Robin Black – sound engineering
 Thing Moss and Trevor White – assistant engineers
 Keith Howard – wood-cutter
 Jay L. Lee – front cover painting
 Shirt Sleeve Studio – back cover

Charts

Certifications

References

External links
 
 Jethro Tull – Songs from the Wood (1977) lyrics at CupOfWonder.com
 Jethro Tull – Songs from the Wood (1977) album releases & credits at Discogs.com
 Jethro Tull – Songs from the Wood (1977) album review at Ground and Sky [Dead Link]
 Jethro Tull – Songs from the Wood (1977) album credits & user reviews at ProgArchives.com
 Jethro Tull – Songs from the Wood (1977) album review by vanderb0b at Sputnikmusic.com
 Jethro Tull – Songs from the Wood (1977/2003 Remaster) album to be listened as stream at Play.Spotify.com

1977 albums
Jethro Tull (band) albums
Chrysalis Records albums
Island Records albums
Albums produced by Ian Anderson
Albums recorded at Morgan Sound Studios